Jonathan C. Coon is an American businessman who is the CEO and co-founder of 1-800 Contacts. He received his B.A. in Advertising and Public Relations in 1994 from Brigham Young University. While a student there, Coon created a small business selling contact lenses to other students. In 1995, his business model helped him win the 1995 Business Plan Competition hosted by BYU's Marriott School of Management, which awarded him capital to help grow his business (originally named 1-800-LENS-NOW) into 1-800 Contacts. Coon is a member of The Church of Jesus Christ of Latter-day Saints.

Coon was the recipient of the 2000 Ernst & Young National Entrepreneur of the Year Award and served on the Utah Valley State College Board of Trustees. He is also a founding member of the BYU Center for Entrepreneurship.

References

External links 
 1-800 Contacts
 BYU Business Plan Competition
 BYU Center for Entrepreneurship

1970 births
21st-century American businesspeople
Latter Day Saints from Utah
Brigham Young University alumni
People from Draper, Utah
Living people
Utah Valley University people